Puraini is one of the administrative divisions of Madhepura district in the Indian state of  Bihar. The block headquarters are located at a distance of 48 km from the district headquarters, namely, Madhepura.

Geography

Panchayats
Panchayats in Puraini community development block are: Kurshandi, Sapardah, Aurai, Nardah, Ganeshpur, dharmapur Puraini, Banshgopal, Makdampur and Durgapur.

Demographics
In the 2001 census Puraini Block had a population of 77,792.

References

Community development blocks in Madhepura district